Cancale (Gallo: Cauncall) is a commune in the Ille-et-Vilaine department in Brittany in northwestern France. It is known as the birthplace of Saint Jeanne Jugan.

Population
Inhabitants of Cancale are called Cancalais in French.

Tourism

Cancale lies along the coast to the east of Saint-Malo. It is a picturesque fishing port popular with visitors, many of whom are drawn by its reputation as the "oyster capital" of Brittany. Though a small town, it is well served by a large number of restaurants, many specialising in seafood. When not eating one can sit and watch the bustle of this busy little town with many stalls selling crustaceans of all types.

The oyster market (marché aux huîtres) at the harbour at the end of Quai de l'Administrateur en Chef Thomas offers a wide variety of local oysters at producer prices. At low tide part of the vast oyster beds can visited.

There is a pleasant coastal path which permits a circular walk from the town to the Pointe du Grouin with views across the bay towards Mont Saint-Michel.

Eugène Feyen painted Cancale and the inhabitants with the oyster-picking Cancalaises for several decades around 1865–1908. Vincent van Gogh wrote that "Eugène Feyen is one of the few painters who pictures intimate modern life as it is really, and does not turn it into fashion plates".

John Singer Sargent featured Cancale in his work: Fishing for Oysters at Cancale.

Oysters

History has it that Louis XIV had his oysters brought to Versailles from Cancale. Centuries later, the farming of oysters is still a major activity in the port and there are oyster beds covering about 7.3 square kilometres easily seen from the pier at the harbour. These beds harvest about 25,000 tons of oysters each year.

International relations

Cancale is twinned with:
 Arnstein, Germany (since 7 September 1988)
 Saint Clement, Jersey (since 2010)

Historically, its position made it vulnerable to English attack during the Seven Years' War.  In 1758 an English army under the Duke of Marlborough landed here for the purpose of attacking Saint-Malo, and pillaged the town. It was again bombarded by the English in 1779.

See also
Communes of the Ille-et-Vilaine department
Auguste Feyen-Perrin
Jacques-Eugène Feyen
The works of Jean Fréour Sculptor of statue depicting Cancale women washing oysters.

References

External links

 Official website 
 Cancale Information and images 
 Cultural Heritage 

Communes of Ille-et-Vilaine
Port cities and towns on the French Atlantic coast
Ports and harbours of the English Channel